The 1999–2000 FA Cup qualifying rounds opened the 119th season of competition in England for 'The Football Association Challenge Cup' (FA Cup), the world's oldest association football single knockout competition. A total of 579 clubs participated in the competition after Manchester United, who were the winners the previous season, decided not enter.

The large number of clubs entering the tournament meant that the competition started with preliminary and four qualifying knockouts for these non-League teams. The 32 winning teams from Fourth qualifying round progressed to the First round proper, where League teams tiered at Levels 3 and 4 entered the competition.

Calendar

Preliminary round
Matches were played on weekend of Saturday 21 August 1999. A total of 394 clubs took part in this stage of the competition, 88 clubs from the four divisions at Level 7 of English football and 306 clubs from fifteen lower level leagues.

First qualifying round
Matches were played on weekend of 4 September 1999. A total of 202 clubs took part in this stage of the competition, including the 197 winners from the preliminary round and five clubs, who get a bye to this round:
Stocksbridge Park Steels
Tooting & Mitcham United
Torrington
Tuffley Rovers
Wimborne Town

Second qualifying round
Matches were played on weekend of 18 September 1999. A total of 168 clubs took part in this stage of the competition, including the 101 winners from the first qualifying round and 67 Level 6 clubs, from Premier divisions of the Isthmian League, Northern Premier League and Southern Football League, entering at this stage.

Third qualifying round
Matches were played on weekend of 2 October 1999. A total of 84 clubs took part, all having progressed from the second qualifying round.

Fourth qualifying round
Matches were played on weekend of Saturday 16 October 1999. A total of 64 clubs took part, 42 having progressed from the third qualifying round and 22 clubs from Football Conference, forming Level 5 of English football, entering at this stage. The round featured Burgess Hill Town and Horsham YMCA from the Sussex County Football League, Crook Town from the Northern Football League and Lymington & New Milton from the Wessex Football League still in the competition, being the lowest ranked clubs in this round.

1999–2000 FA Cup
See 1999–2000 FA Cup for details of the rounds from the first round Proper onwards.

External links
 Football Club History Database: FA Cup 1999–2000
 The FA Cup Archive

Qualifying
FA Cup qualifying rounds